K2-24b also known as EPIC 203771098 b is an exoplanet orbiting the Sun-like star K2-24 every 21 days. It has about the same density as Saturn, at 0.7103 g/cm3, which indicates that the planet is clearly a gas giant.

References

Exoplanets discovered in 2015
Transiting exoplanets
Exoplanets discovered by K2

Scorpius (constellation)